Summer City was a summer entertainment programme staged throughout Wellington the capital city of New Zealand. It was run from January 1979 through to 1987 by the Wellington City Council’s Parks and Recreation Department and the Wellington Community arts Council utilising the Department of Labour’s Temporary Employment Programme, the Project Employment Programme and the Student Community Services Programme. After the Government's funding ceased the programme was continued by Council directly.

One of the guiding philosophies was the encouragement of more diverse public use of Wellington’s many parks, reserves and beaches and as a positive inducement for families to conserve energy by remaining in the Capital for their summer holidays. It was typified by the “Dell Season”, the anchor point of the programme which attracted annual totals in excess of 100,000 attendees. Artists and technical staff were employed with the purpose that they would gain experience and hence future employment.

Origins: Summer '79. 
The Summer City programme started as a citywide outdoor performing arts festival, Summer ’79—created by Rohesia Hamilton Metcalfe of the Wellington City Council Parks and Recreation Department in the course of her work forming new projects to promote the public parks of Wellington.

Taking inspiration from the Artists Co-op's employing of artists in 1978 under the government’s Temporary Employment Programme (TEP), Hamilton Metcalfe arranged full-time employment for four groups of performing artists over the summer of 1979 and set up outdoor events.  As the programme grew, Graeme Nesbitt and Len Nightingale were employed to help expand the programme and organise events and Dransfield House at 355 Willis Street was converted to office and rehearsal space for the staff and artists. Nesbitt added four People’s Park Days, several rock concerts and a programme of Gamelan music and dance. Local restaurants and other artists, including several Artists Co-op artists, also contributed to Summer '79 events.

The programme opened in the Dell of the on 7 January with a "garden party" that included a full afternoon of family entertainment (theatrical, dance, music, readings) and a temporary outdoor restaurant.  The programme continued through February 28 including themed events in the Dell at Wellington Botanic Garden every Sunday, performances at the Wellington Zoo and in the Town Belt and the People's Parks Days in the suburban parks.

The programme's success led to it being continued as an annual summer festival with a new name, Summer City.

The Parks Department's focus on developing family recreation and promoting more use of the parks reflected the parallel work of Barry Thomas and others to utilise otherwise vacant or under-utilised spaces in the city.

Summer City 
Hamilton Metcalfe left the Parks Department in June 1979 and Nesbitt became the Director of the newly-named Summer City, now established in the Arts Centre at 355 Willis Street in Dransfield House. Artists were given relatively free rein to create tours, events, groups, art events, music, theatre, and even magic shows. Venues across the city were jointly selected and timetabled to create a rolling platter of free summer-centred events. Employment went from being housed under the Dominion Museum to the Wellington Community Arts Council.

Artists, technical staff, and management were employed under the Labour Department's Temporary Employment Programme (TEP) and Student Community Services Programme (SCSP) which grew into the Project Employment Programme (PEP) from 1982.

Summer City was used as branding for Wellington City Council summer events through the 1980s, 1900's and early 2000s.

The Arts Centre moved to the Band Rotunda in Oriental Bay then to Toi Poneke.

Events and activities 
The programme offered a very broad range of arts, entertainment and genres: concerts, clowning, portraiture, face painting, circus, dance, modern music, classical music, theatre, poetry, film making, movies, story telling, festivals, comedy, magic, fine art exhibitions, flying lips, travelling shows, exhibitions, Oriental Bay pavement painting, harbour spectacular, tagged fishing competition, sky diving, photography and making a film .

The Sun Festival involved 3000 school children and attracted 60,000 festival goers and thousands of local participants. Composer Jenny McLeod spent three months in the lead up to the Sun Festival event  (1983) teaching 1000 school children to sing her compositions, with the vision for them to be singing together in Oriental Parade in a massive open-air concert.

Town and Country Players toured the whole South Island by ferry and train, Gestetner People's News published a daily newspaper, live farm animals madrigal singing, travelling tree house with native trees Punch and Judy, puppetry,  Night Dance and lighting extravaganza, demonstrations of sky diving, dog trials, show jumping and trampolines, Peter Pan Pirate day, video games, donkey and cart, jazzercize, kitemaking, Birdman competition, rock barge, teaching: potting, yarn spinning hangis All Nations Day, hang gliders, Town and Country day, motorcycle road race, haggis hurling, contemporary day, National Play Day.

Artists and groups 
There were many employed and involved in Summer City and many went on to have established careers. In 1980 there were between 40-50 artists employed with the Student Community Service and the Temporary Employment Programme (TEP).

Artists (employed on temporary, project or one off contracts) 
Up to the mid 1980s some of the artists employed included: Stephanie Arlidge, Paul Baeyertz, John Bailey, Ian Barbie,  Rose Beauchamp, Jean Betts, Joe Bleakley, Peter Boyd, Allan Brunton, Debra Bustin, Clive Carter, Peter Cathro, Allan Clouston, Andrew Clouston, Russel Collins, Jonathan Crayford, Terry Crayford, Gerard Crewdson, Alastair Cuthil, Peter Daly, David Daniela, Peter Dasent, John Davies, Tim Denton, Anthony Donaldson, Neil Duncan, Murray Edmond, Martin Edmond, Janet Elepans, Fane Flaws, Rodger Fox, Garth Frost, Andrea Gilkison, Shelley Graham, Pamela Gray, Mike Gubb, Peter Hambleton, Megan Hanley, Neil Hannan.  Ross Harris, Anna Holmes, Geoff Hughes, Deborah Hunt, Timothy Hyde, Alison Isadora, Paul Jenden,  Bruno Lawrence, Jennifer de Leon, Stephen Jessup, May Lloyd, Louise Loft, Stephen McCurdy, Jenny McLeod, Kassie McCluskie, Bill McDowell, Blair McLaren, Jon McLeary, Tina Matthews, Joanne Mildenhall, Jenny Morris, Michael Mulheron, Sarah Mulheron, Bronwen Murray, Liz Ngan, Mary Paul, Stuart Porter, Jan Preston, Shaun Preston, Ian Prior, Jorge Quevedo,  Alistair Riddell, Sally Rodwell, Barrie Saunders, Michelle Scullion, Roger Sellers, Brian Sergent, Duncan Sergent, Harry Sinclair, Barry Thomas, Edwina Thorne, Rochelle Vincent, The Wizard Tim Woon, Sally Zwartz

Groups 
The programme up to the mid 1908s showcased some of the following groups of musicians and theatre companies:
 Serendipity - Michelle Scullion, Carmel McGlone, Belinda Carey, Edwina Thorne
 The Gallery dancers
 Earthsong
 Chameleon -  Aileen Davidson, Timothy Hyde, Ray Calcutt, Liz, May Lloyd
 Mask Theatre - Murray Edmond
 Town and Country Players - Murray Edmond and Mary Paul toured throughout NZ. South Island tour - Aileen Davidson, Barry Thomas, Michael Mulheron, Shelley Graham
 Negative Theatre - Louise Loft, Jon McLeary
 The Buccaneers - Stuart Porter, Phil Bowering, Roger Sellers, Kelly Blood, Neil Duncan
 Red Mole (Theatre Company) was employed to entertain bathers at Oriental Bay on a floating barge stage  
 Rough Justice - Rick Bryant, Nick Bollinger
 Wide Mouth Frogs - Tina Matthews, Sally Zwartz, Jenny Morris, Andrea Gilkison, Katie Brokie, Sarah Mulheron, Bronwen Murray, Tony Backhouse, Michelle Scullion, Michael Mulheron, Callie Blood
 The Warratahs - Barry Saunders, Wayne Mason, Nik Brown, John Donahue, Marty Jorgensen, Clinton Brown, Rob Clarkson
 Jasmin - Jonathan Crayford, Bruno Lawrence, Dave Ades, Geoff Hughes, Jorge Quevedo, Patrick Bleakley
 The Maori Sidesteps
 Rodger Fox Big Band
 Topp Twins
 Valley Stompers
 Free Radicals - Jonathan Besser, Ross Harris 
 Splints
 Sydney Street West Quartet
 Footnote Dancers
 Captain Frootkakes Punch and Judy Show
 Sun Chasers
 Hot City Cats

Programme Directors 
The first three managers worked from The Arts Centre at 355 Willis street

 Rohesia Hamilton Metcalfe - Promotions of Parks and creator of Summer '79
 Graeme Nesbitt - Summer City 1979-1980
 Stephen Nelson - Summer City 1981-1982
 Darcy Nicholas -  Summer City
 Fiona Gunter-Firth - Summer City Toi Poneke

Staff and Technicians

Summer City staff 
 Peter Frater - Technical Manager
 Tom Wilton - Electrician
 Malcom McSporran - Journalist
 Rod Bryant - Journalist
 Ray Calcutt - Staging
 Jane Armstrong - Secretary
 Len Nightingale - Outdoor stage manager
 Delia Shanly - Events Coordinator

Wellington City Council staff 
 Ian Galloway - Director of Parks and Reserves
 Colin Knox - Deputy Town Clark
 Dave Lee - Recreation Officer
 John Dawson - Manager summer city for Parks 1980 - Parks
 Di Jordan - Assistant to John Dawson - Parks

Photographers 
Ans Westra

Peter Black

Mark Hantler

Venues 

Venues were found throughout the city:
 Botanic Garden's Dell
 Ben Burn Park
 Anderson Park
 Wellington East Girls College, Onslow College, Town Belt, Berhampore Golf Course, Plimmer Park, Hataitai Park, Central Park
 Sound Shell
 Oriental Bay
 Cuba Mall
 Seatoun Park
 Scorching Bay
 Strathmore park
 Island Bay Playground
 Wellington Zoo
 Frank Kitts Park
 Prince of Wales Park
 Lyall Bay
 Queen Elizabeth Park

References 

Festivals in Wellington
Wellington City